Yeongdeungpo-gu Office station is a station on Seoul Subway Line 2 and Seoul Subway Line 5.  Before Mok-dong station on Line 5 was completed, this station served as a link to that neighbourhood via bus.

References

Railway stations opened in 1984
Seoul Metropolitan Subway stations
Metro stations in Yeongdeungpo District
1984 establishments in South Korea
20th-century architecture in South Korea